Sultan Abu Bakr Shah (reigned 1389–1390), was a Muslim ruler of the Tughlaq dynasty. He was the son of Zafar Khan and the grandson  of Sultan Feroze Shah Tughluq.

Life 
After Ghiyas-ud-Din Tughlaq II (who had succeeded Sultan Feroze Shah Tughluq) was murdered, Abu Bakr became ruler of the Tughlaq dynasty of the Delhi Sultanate. However, his uncle, Muhammad Shah, also desired to be ruler, and struggled against Abu Bakr over the control of the throne. Muhammad Shah attacked Delhi in August 1390 to claim the throne. Abu Bakr was defeated in August 1390, and Muhammad Shah succeeded him as king, reigning from 1390 to 1394. After his defeat, Abu Bakr was imprisoned in the fort of Meerut and died soon after.

References

Tughluq sultans
14th-century Indian Muslims
14th-century Indian monarchs